"How Does It Feel" is a song by American recording artist Anita Baker. The song was released as a second single from her My Everything album. "How Does It Feel" peaked #41 on Billboard's R&B/Hip-Hop Singles.

Charts

References

External links
 www.AnitaBaker.com

2004 songs
Anita Baker songs
Songs written by Barry Eastmond
2004 singles
Songs written by Anita Baker
Blue Note Records singles